Melasti is a Hindu Balinese purification ceremony and ritual, which according to Balinese calendar is held several days prior to the Nyepi holy day. It is observed by Hindus in Indonesia, especially in Bali. Melasti was meant as the ritual to cleanse the world from all the filth of sin and bad karma, through the symbolic act of acquiring the Tirta Amerta, "the water of life".
 
 
Melasti ceremony is held on the edge of the beach with the aim to purify oneself of all the bad things in the past and throw it to the ocean. 
In Hindu belief, the source of water such as lake and sea water, are considered as the source of life(Tirta Amrita). In addition to performing prayers, during Melasti ceremony, all of sacred objects which belongs to a temple, such as pralingga or pratima of Lord Ida Sanghyang Widi Wasa, and all of sacred equipments, are being cleaned and purified.

References

Ceremonies in Indonesia